Adams Township is one of thirteen townships in Parke County, Indiana, United States. As of the 2010 census, its population was 5,825 and it contained 2,062 housing units.

History
Adams Township was named for James Adams, a pioneer settler, but the date of the township's organization is unknown because early records were lost.

The Beeson Covered Bridge, Billie Creek Covered Bridge, Catlin Covered Bridge, Crooks Covered Bridge, Leatherwood Station Covered Bridge, McAllister Covered Bridge, Neet Covered Bridge, and Sanitorium Covered Bridge were listed on the National Register of Historic Places in 1978.

Geography

Cities, towns, villages
 Rockville (the county seat)

Unincorporated towns
 Billie Creek Village at 
 Leatherwood at 
 New Discovery at 
 Piattsville at 
(This list is based on USGS data and may include former settlements.)

Cemeteries
The township contains these four cemeteries: Hatfield, Memory Garden, Rowe and Union.

Major highways
  U.S. Route 36
  U.S. Route 41

Airports and landing strips
 Butler Field

School districts
 Rockville Community Schools

Political districts
 State House District 42
 State House District 44
 State Senate District 38

References
 
 United States Census Bureau 2009 TIGER/Line Shapefiles
 IndianaMap

External links
 Indiana Township Association
 United Township Association of Indiana
 City-Data.com page for Adams Township

Townships in Parke County, Indiana
Townships in Indiana